Chandarlapadu mandal is one of the 20 mandals in NTR District of the Indian state of Andhra Pradesh. It is under the administration of Nandigama revenue division and headquarters located at Chandarlapadu. The mandal is situated on the banks of Krishna River, bounded by Jaggayyapeta, Nandigama, Kanchikacherla mandals.

Administration 
The mandal is partially a part of the Andhra Pradesh Capital Region under the jurisdiction of APCRDA.

Settlements 
Chandarlapadu mandal consists of 20 villages. The following are the list of villages in the mandal:

Bobbellapadu
Brahmabotlapalem
Chandarlapadu
Chintalapadu
Eturu
Gudimetla
Kasarabada
Kodavatikallu
Konayapalem
Munagala palle
Muppalla
Patempadu
Pokkunuru
Popuru
Punnavalli
Thotaravulapadu
Thurlapadu
Ustepalle
Veladi Kotthapalem
Vibhareetalapadu

Sources:
 Census India 2011 (sub districts)
 Revenue Department of AP

References 

Mandals in NTR district